Richard Thorne may refer to:
 Richard M. Thorne, American physicist
 Richard Thorne Thorne, British physician